Alexey Igorevich Marchenko (born 2 January 1992) is a Russian professional ice hockey defenceman who currently plays for Lokomotiv Yaroslavl in the Kontinental Hockey League (KHL). Marchenko was drafted 205th overall by the Detroit Red Wings in the 2011 NHL Entry Draft.

Playing career
As a youth, Marchenko played in the 2005 Quebec International Pee-Wee Hockey Tournament with a team from Moscow.

Junior
During the 2009–10 season, Marchenko appeared in 43 games for CSKA's junior club, Red Army of the MHL, and recorded 11 goals and 12 assists as well as going scoreless in two playoff games for the club. He also appeared in 10 KHL games for CSKA Moscow and failed to register a point.

During the 2010–11 season, Marchenko recorded 38 points in 36 games for Red Army, along with three goals and eight assists in 15 playoff games, to help his club capture the Kharlamov Cup. He also appeared in 23 KHL games for CSKA, where he recorded two assists.

During the 2011–12 season, Marchenko skated in six games for CSKA Moscow in the KHL and was impressive in the MHL playoffs after missing most of the season, due to a knee injury. He was scoreless in his brief KHL stint. He skated in five regular season games for Red Army in the MHL, recording two goals and four assists. Marchenko was the leading scorer amongst defensemen for Red Army in the playoffs, finishing with four goals and 14 assists. The defending Kharlamov Cup champions, Red Army was defeated by Omskie Yastrebi in the MHL finals.

Professional
During the 2012–13 season, Marchenko played 44 games for CSKA Moscow in his first full KHL season. He recorded four goals and five assists. CSKA finished first in the Tarasov Division and swept Lev Praha before falling to Dynamo Moscow in the Western Conference semifinals. Marchenko saw limited ice time in seven playoff games; finishing with no points nor penalty minutes.

On 30 May 2013, Marchenko signed a three-year entry-level contract with the Detroit Red Wings.

During the 2013–14 season, Marchenko was assigned to the Red Wings's AHL affiliate, the Grand Rapids Griffins. In his rookie season, Marchenko recorded three goals and 15 assists in 49 games. On 4 January 2014, Marchenko made his NHL debut in a game against the Dallas Stars. On 23 February 2014, in a game against the Milwaukee Admirals, Marchenko went feet-first into the boards, and suffered a severe high ankle sprain. An MRI revealed a fractured bone and a day later he had surgery in Grand Rapids where doctors inserted stabilizing screws into his ankle. As a result, he missed the remainder of the season.

On 28 February 2015, Marchenko scored his first career NHL goal against Pekka Rinne of the Nashville Predators.

On 1 July 2016, Marchenko signed a two-year contract extension with the Red Wings. In the following 2016–17 season, Marchenko appeared in 30 games registering 6 assists, before he was placed on waivers by the Red Wings on 3 February 2017. The following day, he was claimed by the Toronto Maple Leafs, marking a reunion with former head coach Mike Babcock. In a game against his former team Marchenko scored his first goal of the 2016–17 NHL season on 7 March 2017.

In the off-season, Marchenko was placed on waivers and released from the final year of his contract with the Maple Leafs on 14 August 2017. With the intention to return to Russia and resume playing for CSKA Moscow, Marchenko promptly agreed to a three-year contract with his original club on 16 August 2017.

At the conclusion of his three-year contract with CSKA, helping claim the Gagarin Cup in 2019, Marchenko left the club as a free agent to sign a two-year contract with Lokomotiv Yaroslavl on 6 May 2020.

International play

Marchenko made his international debut for Russia at the 2008 World U-17 Hockey Challenge, where he recorded one goal in five games. He later represented Russia at the 2009 World U-17 Hockey Challenge, where he recorded three assists in five games.

Marchenko represented Russia at the 2016 IIHF World Championship, where he recorded one goal and two assists in ten games, and won a bronze medal. Marchenko again represented Russia at the 2016 World Cup of Hockey. He was a member of the Olympic Athletes from Russia team that competed at the 2018 Winter Olympics.

Career statistics

Regular season and playoffs

International

Awards and honors

References

External links
 

1992 births
Living people
HC CSKA Moscow players
Detroit Red Wings draft picks
Detroit Red Wings players
Grand Rapids Griffins players
Krasnaya Armiya (MHL) players
Lokomotiv Yaroslavl players
Russian expatriate ice hockey people
Russian expatriate sportspeople in the United States
Russian ice hockey defencemen
Ice hockey people from Moscow
Toronto Maple Leafs players
Ice hockey players at the 2018 Winter Olympics
Olympic ice hockey players of Russia
Medalists at the 2018 Winter Olympics
Olympic medalists in ice hockey
Olympic gold medalists for Olympic Athletes from Russia